Herbert Fisk Johnson Jr. (November 15, 1899 – December 13, 1978), was an American businessman and manufacturer. He was the grandson of company founder Samuel Curtis Johnson. He was the third generation of his family to lead S. C. Johnson & Son, Inc of Racine, Wisconsin.

Cornell

He graduated from Cornell University in 1922. He was an active board member from 1947 to 1972, an emeritus board member from 1972 to 1978, a Presidential Councillor and one of the university's preeminent benefactors.  He was a member of the Chi Psi fraternity.  The I. M. Pei designed Herbert F. Johnson Museum of Art on the Cornell campus is named for him.

SC Johnson & Son

Johnson took over leadership of SC Johnson & Son from his father Herbert Fisk Johnson Sr. and served as its president.  He passed it to his son, Samuel Curtis Johnson Jr.

Johnson Wax Administration Building
In 1936, he hired Frank Lloyd Wright to design a new administration building for his company in Racine, Wisconsin.

His home
Soon after the commission for the administration building, Johnson commissioned Wright to build him a home on nearby farmland.  The result, known as Wingspread, was built in 1938-39 near Racine, Wisconsin.  It was donated by Johnson and his wife, Irene Purcell to The Johnson Family Foundation in 1959 as an international educational conference facility.

Film
In 1935, Johnson flew from Milwaukee to Fortaleza, Ceará, in an amphibious twin-engine Sikorsky S-38.
The trip was to learn more about the carnauba palm tree (Copernicia prunifera) of north eastern Brazil which produced carnauba wax, one of the main products of his company, and to determine whether groves of these trees could produce enough to meet future demand.
This led to investments in Brazil, establishment of a subsidiary in 1960, and eventually to the foundation of the Serra das Almas Private Natural Heritage Reserve to protect an area of the caatinga biome including wild carnauba palms.
His 1935 two month, 7,500 mile journey to northeastern Brazil as well as his somewhat difficult relationship with his son, Samuel Curtis Johnson Jr., was documented in his son's 2001 film Carnuba: A Son's Memoir.  The film includes footage from a repeat of that journey that the Johnson family undertook in 1998.

Personal life 
Johnson was married three times. He married his first wife, the former Gertrude Brauner, daughter of Cornell University professor Olaf Brauner, in 1923. They were the parents of three children, Karen (b. 16 May 1924), Henrietta (b. 16 April 1927) and Samuel Curtis Jr.(b. 2 March 1928). Herbert and Gertrude were divorced about 1931; their middle daughter Henrietta also died in 1931 (30 March).

He later married (31 December 1936) the former (Esther) Jane Tilton, the widow of William Clyde Roach of Indianapolis, Indiana. Jane died from an embolism on 30 May 1938 in Racine. In 1941, Johnson married Irene Purcell, an actress. They remained married until her death in 1972.

References

External links
 Summary of Carnuba: A Son's Memoir
 Membership of Chi Psi
 Herbert F. Johnson Museum of Art

Businesspeople from Racine, Wisconsin
Samuel Curtis Johnson family
Cornell University alumni
20th-century American businesspeople
Burials in Wisconsin
Phillips family (New England)
1899 births
1978 deaths